Pythia (minor planet designation: 432 Pythia) is a typical Main belt asteroid.

It was discovered by Auguste Charlois on 18 December 1897 in Nice.

References

External links 
 
 

Background asteroids
Pythia
Pythia
S-type asteroids (Tholen)
S-type asteroids (SMASS)
18971218